Jabal Maswar is a sub-district located in Maswar District, 'Amran Governorate, Yemen. Jabal Maswar had a population of 4328  according to the 2004 census.

References 

Sub-districts in Maswar District